is a railway station in the city of Ashikaga, Tochigi, Japan, operated by the private railway operator Tōbu Railway.

Lines

Station layout
This station has a single elevated island platform with the station building underneath.

Platforms

Adjacent stations

History
Yashū-Yamabe Station opened on 20 July 1925.

From 17 March 2012, station numbering was introduced on all Tōbu lines, with Yashū-Yamabe Station becoming "TI-16".

Passenger statistics
In fiscal 2019, the station was used by an average of 895 passengers daily (boarding passengers only).

Surrounding area
 Ashikaga Yawata Post Office
 Shimotsuke Issha Hachiman-gu

See also
 List of railway stations in Japan

References

External links

 Yashū-Yamabe Station information (Tōbu) 

Railway stations in Tochigi Prefecture
Tobu Isesaki Line
Stations of Tobu Railway
Railway stations in Japan opened in 1925
Ashikaga, Tochigi